A carbon carousel uses panels that, after being depleted of CO2 in the regeneration chamber, exit this chamber and enter the carousel. The carousel rotates the CO2-sorbent panels through the air, collecting CO2 all the while, until the CO2-saturated panels reach the point of entry to the regeneration chamber. The regeneration process provides new panels for the exit to the recovery process.

Cited sources 

Carbon dioxide